The Bryant Bulldogs men's lacrosse team represents Bryant University in National Collegiate Athletic Association (NCAA) Division I lacrosse. As of the upcoming 2023 season, the Bulldogs will compete in the America East Conference (AmEast), which Bryant will officially join on July 1, 2022. Bryant plays its home games at Beirne Stadium on its campus in Smithfield, Rhode Island.

Background
The coach is currently Mike Pressler, who previously coached Duke. The team plays its home games at Beirne Stadium. Bryant completed a 12-season tenure in the Northeast Conference (NEC) in 2022, after which it moved its entire athletic program to the AmEast. Before becoming a full member of the NEC in 2008, Bryant had been a member of the NCAA Division II Northeast-10 Conference (NE-10).

The team joined NCAA Division I as an independent for the 2009 and 2010 seasons. The NEC first sponsored men's lacrosse for the 2011 season.

NCAAs
In 2013, Bryant made their first NCAA Tournament appearance, losing 12–7 to Syracuse. That season, Bryant also managed to capture the NEC Conference Regular Season Championship, as well as the NEC Tournament, which earned them an automatic bid.

A season later, in 2014, Bryant made their second tournament appearance after again winning the NEC Tournament. After defeating Siena 9–8 in a play-in game, they faced Syracuse for the second time and managed to avenge their loss of the previous year, pulling off a first round 10–9 upset.

Season results

 (1) LaxBytes / Laxpower / Lax Numbers Power Ratings / NCAA RPIs / Massey Ratings
 (2) Won NEC tournament final over Saint Joseph's 10-6. Lost to Marist 10-6 in NCAA play-in game.
 (3) Won NEC tournament final over Hobart 10-4. Defeated Siena 9–8 in NCAA play-in. Defeated Syracuse 10-9 in NCAA 1st Round. Lost to Maryland 16-8 in NCAA Quarterfinals.
 (4) Won NEC tournament final over Robert Morris 10-4. Lost Syracuse 12-7 in NCAA 1st round.
 (5) Bryant won NEC tournament final, but did not receive NCAA Tournament invite because of the five team NEC that season, six conference teams are required to get a conference automatic qualifier to the NCAA tournament. Bryant was 4 and 1 in conference. 
 (6) Initial NCAA Division I season.
 (7) Won Division II N.E. tournament finals over Le Moyne 5-4. Lost to Le Moyne 11–2 in NCAA Division II tournament semifinals.

References

External links
 

 
2000 establishments in Rhode Island
Lacrosse clubs established in 2000